Cuba competed at the 1968 Summer Olympics in Mexico City, Mexico. 115 competitors, 101 men and 14 women, took part in 78 events in 13 sports.

Medalists

Silver
Enrique Regüeiferos — Boxing, Men's Light Welterweight 
Rolando Garbey — Boxing, Men's Light Middleweight
Enrique Figuerola, Pablo Montes, Juan Morales, and Hermes Ramirez — Athletics, Men's 4×100 metre relay 
Miguelina Cobián, Marlene Elejarde, Violetta Quesada, and Fulgencia Romay — Athletics, Women's 4×100 metre relay

Athletics

Basketball

Boxing

Cycling

Six cyclists represented Cuba in 1968.

Individual road race
 Sergio Martínez
 Roberto Menéndez
 Ulises Váldez
 Raúl Marcelo Vázquez

Sprint
 Juan Reyes
 Raúl Marcelo Vázquez

1000m time trial
 Raúl Marcelo Vázquez

Tandem
 Juan Reyes
 Ulises Váldez

Individual pursuit
 Inocente Lizano

Team pursuit
 Sergio Martínez
 Roberto Menéndez
 Raúl Marcelo Vázquez
 Inocente Lizano

Diving

Fencing

13 fencers, 11 men and 2 women, represented Cuba in 1968.

Men's foil
 Dagoberto Borges
 Jesús Gil
 Orlando Ruíz

Men's team foil
 Eduardo Jhons, Orlando Ruíz, Jesús Gil, Dagoberto Borges

Men's épée
 Gustavo Oliveros
 José Antonio Díaz
 Manuel González

Men's team épée
 Orlando Ruíz, Gustavo Oliveros, Manuel González, José Antonio Díaz

Men's sabre
 Félix Delgado
 Manuel Ortíz
 José Narciso Díaz

Men's team sabre
 Manuel Ortíz, José Narciso Díaz, Joaquin Tack-Fang, Félix Delgado

Women's foil
 Milady Tack-Fang
 Margarita Rodríguez

Gymnastics

Rowing

Shooting

Eight shooters, all men, represented Cuba in 1968.

50 m pistol
 Nelson Oñate
 Arturo Costa

50 m rifle, three positions
 Raúl Llanos
 Sergio Álvarez

50 m rifle, prone
 Silvio Delgado
 Enrique Guedes

Skeet
 Ignacio Huguet
 Delfin Gómez

Swimming

Water polo

Men's Team Competition
Preliminary Round (Group A)
 Lost to Soviet Union (4:11)
 Defeated Brazil (9:2)
 Tied with United States (6:6)
 Defeated West Germany (7:6)
 Defeated Spain (4:3)
 Lost to Hungary (1:7)
Classification Matches
5th/8th place: Lost to East Germany (2:8)
7th/8th place: Lost to Netherlands (5:8) → 8th place
Team Roster
Guillermo Canete
Guillermo Martínez
Ibrahim Rodríguez
Jesús Pérez
Miguel García
Oscar Periche 
Osvaldo García
Roberto Rodríguez
Rolando Valdes
Ruben Junco 
Waldimiro Arcos

Weightlifting

Wrestling

References

External links
Official Olympic Reports
International Olympic Committee results database

Nations at the 1968 Summer Olympics
1968
1968 in Cuban sport